Riccardo Rossi (born 9 November 1963) is an Italian voice actor.

Biography
Born in Rome, Rossi began his career dubbing characters into the Italian language at an early age. As a child, he voiced Toulouse in the Italian language dub of The Aristocats. He later went on to continue his dubbing career as an adult and he serves as the official Italian voice actor of Adam Sandler, Ben Affleck, Cuba Gooding Jr., Paul Walker, Mark Ruffalo and Christian Bale. Other actors he dubs includes Johnny Depp, Matt Damon and Mark Wahlberg.

Some of Rossi's most popular character dubbing contributions include an adult Simba in The Lion King franchise as well as Brian O'Conner (portrayed by Paul Walker) in The Fast and the Furious film series and Bruce Banner (portrayed by Mark Ruffalo) in the Marvel Cinematic Universe.

Personal life
Rossi is the younger brother of voice actors Massimo and Emanuela Rossi. He is also the cousin of voice actors Laura and Fabio Boccanera.

Dubbing roles

Animation
Simba in The Lion King
Simba in The Lion King II: Simba's Pride
Simba in The Lion King 1½
Simba in Timon & Pumbaa
Simba in The Lion Guard
Simba in Disney's House of Mouse
Toulouse in The Aristocats
Prince Proteus in Sinbad: Legend of the Seven Seas
Sheen Estevez in Jimmy Neutron: Boy Genius
Grouchy Smurf in The Smurfs
Lars Fillmore in Futurama: Bender's Big Score
John Greystoke in Tarzan
Zino in Boo, Zino & the Snurks

Live action
Sonny Koufax in Big Daddy
Longfellow Deeds in Mr. Deeds
Barry Egan in Punch-Drunk Love
Lenny Feder in Grown Ups
Lenny Feder in Grown Ups 2
Chuck Levine in I Now Pronounce You Chuck & Larry
Danny Maccabee in Just Go with It
George Simmons in Funny People
Donny Berger in That's My Boy
Sam Brenner in Pixels
Dave Buznik in Anger Management
Henry Roth in 50 First Dates
John Clasky in Spanglish
Paul Crewe in The Longest Yard
Michael Newman in Click
Charlie Fineman in Reign Over Me
Zohan Dvir in You Don't Mess with the Zohan
Skeeter Bronson in Bedtime Stories
Jack Sadelstein / Jill Sadelstein in Jack and Jill
Jim Friedman in Blended
Adam Sandler in Top Five
Tommy Dunson Stockburn in The Ridiculous 6
Max Simkin in The Cobbler
Sandy Wexler in Sandy Wexler
Danny Meyerowitz in The Meyerowitz Stories
Nick Spitz in Murder Mystery
Don Truby in Men, Women & Children
Max Kessler in The Do-Over
Kenny Lustig in The Week Of
Howard Ratner in Uncut Gems
Hubie Dubois in Hubie Halloween
Brian O'Conner in The Fast and the Furious
Brian O'Conner in 2 Fast 2 Furious
Brian O'Conner in Fast & Furious
Brian O'Conner in Fast Five
Brian O'Conner in Fast & Furious 6
Brian O'Conner in Furious 7
Chris Johnston in Timeline
Dean Sampson Jr. in She's All That
Ben Garvey in The Lazarus Project
John Rahway in Takers
Damien Collier in Brick Mansions
Bruce Banner / Hulk in The Avengers
Bruce Banner / Hulk in Iron Man 3
Bruce Banner / Hulk in Avengers: Age of Ultron
Bruce Banner / Hulk in Thor: Ragnarok
Bruce Banner / Hulk in Avengers: Infinity War
Bruce Banner / Hulk in Captain Marvel
Bruce Banner / Hulk in Avengers: Endgame
Stan Fink in Eternal Sunshine of the Spotless Mind
Ray Fanning in Collateral
Dylan Rhodes-Shrike in Now You See Me
Dylan Rhodes-Shrike in Now You See Me 2
Dan Mulligan in Begin Again
Dave Schultz in Foxcatcher
Cam Stuart in Infinitely Polar Bear
Michael Rezendes in Spotlight
Jeff Daly in Rumor Has It
Patrick Bateman in American Psycho
Quinn Abercromby in Reign of Fire
John Preston in Equilibrium
Alfred Borden in The Prestige
Dan Evans in 3:10 to Yuma
John Connor in Terminator Salvation
Irving Rosenfeld in American Hustle
Russell Baze in Out of the Furnace
Joseph J. Blocker in Hostiles
Bagheera in Mowgli: Legend of the Jungle
Ken Miles in Ford v Ferrari
Gilbert Grape in What's Eating Gilbert Grape
Paul Kemp in The Rum Diary
Axel Blackmar in Arizona Dream
John Arnold DeMarco / Don Juan in Don Juan DeMarco
Joseph D. Pistone in Donnie Brasco
William Blake / Johnny Depp in L.A. Without a Map
Dean Corso in The Ninth Gate
Spencer Armacost in The Astronaut's Wife
Ichabod Crane in Sleepy Hollow
George Jung in Blow
Sheldon Jeffrey Sands in Once Upon a Time in Mexico
Mort Rainey in Secret Window
J. M. Barrie in Finding Neverland
Guy LaPointe in Tusk
Guy LaPointe in Yoga Hosers
Rod Tidwell in Jerry Maguire
Frank Sachs in As Good as It Gets
Theo Caulder in Instinct
Owen Templeton in Rat Race
James Robert "Radio" Kennedy in Radio
Darrin Hill in The Fighting Temptations
Salim Adel in Dirty
Charlie Hinton in Daddy Day Camp
Michael Dixon in Linewatch
Ben Carson in Gifted Hands: The Ben Carson Story
Lewis Hicks in Ticking Clock
Jonas Arbor in The Hit List
El Chameleón 2 in Machete Kills
Fred Gray in Selma
Bruce Wayne / Batman in Batman v Superman: Dawn of Justice
Bruce Wayne / Batman in Suicide Squad
Bruce Wayne / Batman in Justice League
Neil in He's Just Not That Into You
Bartleby in Dogma
Rafe McCawley in Pearl Harbor
Michael in The Third Wheel
Lawrence Bowen in Daddy and Them
Gavin Banek in Changing Lanes
Holden McNeil / Ben Affleck in Jay and Silent Bob Strike Back
Larry Gigli in Gigli
Ollie Trinké in Jersey Girl
George Reeves in Hollywoodland
Jack Giamoro in Man About Town
Stephen Collins in State of Play
Doug MacRay in The Town
Tony Mendez in Argo
Neil in To the Wonder
Chris Wolff in The Accountant
Joe Coughlin in Live by Night
Tom "Redfly" Davis in Triple Frontier
Linus Caldwell in Ocean's Eleven
Linus Caldwell in Ocean's Twelve
Linus Caldwell in Ocean's Thirteen
Britton Davis in Geronimo: An American Legend
Mike McDermott in Rounders
Steven Sanderson in Finding Forrester
John Grady Cole in All the Pretty Horses
Bryan Woodman in Syriana
Francois Pienaar in Invictus
George Lonegan in Hereafter
Narrator in Inside Job
Steve Butler in Promised Land
Max Da Costa in Elysium
Scott Thorson in Behind the Candelabra
Mann in Interstellar
William Garin in The Great Wall
William Wharton in The Green Mile
Eric Knox in Charlie's Angels
Chuck Barris in Confessions of a Dangerous Mind
Frank James in The Assassination of Jesse James by the Coward Robert Ford
Sam Bell in Moon
Robert Goode in Everybody's Fine
Doc in Cowboys & Aliens
John Moon in A Single Shot
Eric Bowen in Poltergeist
Jason Dixon in Three Billboards Outside Ebbing, Missouri
Eddie Adams in Boogie Nights
Mickey in The Basketball Diaries
Leo Handler in The Yards
Lewis Bartholomew in The Truth About Charlie
Tommy Corn in I Heart Huckabees
Chris Farraday in Contraband
Éomer in The Lord of the Rings: The Two Towers
Éomer in The Lord of the Rings: The Return of the King
Priest in Priest
Vincent Stevens in The Loft
Will Ruiney in Hangman
Danny Gallagher in Bent
John Grimes in Black Hawk Down
Young Edward Bloom in Big Fish
Henry Bennett in The Impossible
Ian Blaine in Cassandra's Dream
Bill Fordham in August: Osage County
Ethan Hunt in Mission: Impossible III
Ray Ferrier in War of the Worlds
Hannibal King in Blade: Trinity
George Lutz in The Amityville Horror
Michael Taylor in Fireflies in the Garden
Matt Weston in Safe House
Damian Hale / Mark Bitwell in Self/less
E. Randol Schoenberg in Woman in Gold
Bill Pope in Criminal
Michael Bryce in The Hitman's Bodyguard
Gary Winston in An Unfinished Life
Hector in Our Kind of Traitor
Steve McQueen in Once Upon a Time in Hollywood
Jason "J.D." Dean in Heathers
Andy Smith in Tales from the Darkside: The Movie
Will Scarlett in Robin Hood: Prince of Thieves
Clarence Worley in True Romance
Adam in Untamed Heart
Trevor Allen Finch in Who Is Cletis Tout?
Choozy Doozy Host in Hot Tub Time Machine 2
Dereck McKinley in The Summit
Kirby Keager in St. Elmo's Fire
James St. James in Men at Work
Alex Furlong in Freejack
Jack Colt in Loaded Weapon 1
Bill Reimers in Another Stakeout
Frank Wyatt in Judgment Night
Jack Slayton in A Man Apart
Fritz Messing in Catch and Release
David in The Crazies
Henry in Mother's Day
CIA Agent Geneva in Snowden

References

External links

1963 births
Living people
Male actors from Rome
Italian male voice actors
Italian voice directors
20th-century Italian male actors
21st-century Italian male actors